Events in the year 1968 in Japan.

Incumbents
Emperor: Hirohito
Prime Minister: Eisaku Satō (Liberal Democratic)
Chief Cabinet Secretary: Toshio Kimura until November 30, Shigeru Hori
Chief Justice of the Supreme Court: Masatoshi Yokota
President of the House of Representatives: Mitsujirō Ishii
President of the House of Councillors: Yūzō Shigemune

Governors
Aichi Prefecture: Mikine Kuwahara 
Akita Prefecture: Yūjirō Obata 
Aomori Prefecture: Shunkichi Takeuchi 
Chiba Prefecture: Taketo Tomonō 
Ehime Prefecture: Sadatake Hisamatsu 
Fukui Prefecture: Heidayū Nakagawa 
Fukuoka Prefecture: Hikaru Kamei 
Fukushima Prefecture: Morie Kimura
Gifu Prefecture: Saburō Hirano 
Gunma Prefecture: Konroku Kanda 
Hiroshima Prefecture: Iduo Nagano 
Hokkaido: Kingo Machimura 
Hyogo Prefecture: Motohiko Kanai 
Ibaraki Prefecture: Nirō Iwakami 
Ishikawa Prefecture: Yōichi Nakanishi 
Iwate Prefecture: Tadashi Chida 
Kagawa Prefecture: Masanori Kaneko 
Kagoshima Prefecture: Saburō Kanemaru 
Kanagawa Prefecture: Bunwa Tsuda 
Kochi Prefecture: Masumi Mizobuchi 
Kumamoto Prefecture: Kōsaku Teramoto 
Kyoto Prefecture: Torazō Ninagawa 
Mie Prefecture: Satoru Tanaka 
Miyagi Prefecture: Shintaro Takahashi 
Miyazaki Prefecture: Hiroshi Kuroki 
Nagano Prefecture: Gon'ichirō Nishizawa 
Nagasaki Prefecture: Katsuya Sato 
Nara Prefecture: Ryozo Okuda 
Niigata Prefecture: Shiro Watari
Oita Prefecture: Kaoru Kinoshita 
Okayama Prefecture: Takenori Kato 
Osaka Prefecture: Gisen Satō 
Saga Prefecture: Sunao Ikeda 
Saitama Prefecture: Hiroshi Kurihara 
Shiga Prefecture: Kinichiro Nozaki 
Shiname Prefecture: Choemon Tanabe 
Shizuoka Prefecture: Yūtarō Takeyama 
Tochigi Prefecture: Nobuo Yokokawa 
Tokushima Prefecture: Yasunobu Takeichi 
Tokyo: Ryōkichi Minobe 
Tottori Prefecture: Jirō Ishiba 
Toyama Prefecture: Minoru Yoshida 
Wakayama Prefecture: Masao Ohashi 
Yamagata Prefecture: Tōkichi Abiko 
Yamaguchi Prefecture: Masayuki Hashimoto 
Yamanashi Prefecture: Kunio Tanabe

Events
 Japan at the 1968 Summer Olympics
 Japan at the 1968 Winter Olympics

January
 January 23 – Mushi (Osamu Tezuka) Production, as predecessor of Tezuka Production was founded.
 Unknown date: Komeda Coffeehouse, as known well coffeehouse chain in nationwide, founded in Nagoya.

February
 February 19: 1968–69 Japanese university protests sparked over a dispute within the University of Tokyo medical school.

March
 March 2: Fuji-Q Highland officially open in Fujiyoshida, Yamanashi Prefecture.

April
 April 1: 1968 Hyūga-nada earthquake
 April 1: Abukuma Express line opened
 April 12: Kasumigaseki Building opened, was the first modern office skyscraper and tallest building in Tokyo until 1970.
 April 15: Tōmei Expressway opened

May
 May 16: 1968 Tokachi earthquake

June
 June 16: Terrorist incident on the Yokosuka Line kills 1.
 June 26: Bonin Islands returned to Japan by United States Navy after 23-year occupation.

July
 July 1: Postal code system adopted in Japan.
 July 7: Shintaro Ishihara and others are elected to the House of Councillors.

August
 August 18: 1968 Hida river bus accident, two charter buses occur debris flow, following push into Hida River, Gifu Prefecture, due after heavy torrential rain. According to local official confirmed report, 104 people lost to lives with one of worst road accident in Northeast Asia.

October
 October: Golgo 13, which becomes the longest-running ongoing manga, makes its debut on Big Comic.
 October 21: New Left forces occupy Shinjuku Station for International Anti-War Day. Arrests are made.

November
 November 2: A resort hotel fire in Arima Spa, Kobe, Hyogo Prefecture, according to Fire and Disaster Management Agency official confirmed report, 30 person lost to lives, with 44 person wounded.

December
 December 10: 300 million yen robbery
 December 27: Toei Mita Line opened.

Births
 January 1: Miki Higashino, pianist and composer
 February 22: Kazuhiro Sasaki, former Japan professional and Major League Baseball pitcher
 April 1
 Masumi Kuwata, former professional baseball pitcher
 Ryōta Takeda, politician
 April 11: Yōichi Okabayashi, former professional baseball pitcher  
 May 1: Akiko Kijimuta, former tennis player
 May 4: Momoko Kikuchi, actress and singer
 July 5: Ken Akamatsu
 November 12: Aya Hisakawa, voice actress
 November 25: Shingo Takatsu, professional baseball coach and former pitcher
 December 25: Koichi Ogata, former baseball manager and player

Deaths
 January 9: Kōkichi Tsuburaya, athlete (b. 1940)
January 29: Tsuguharu Foujita, painter (b. 1886)
 July 19: Kan Shimozawa, novelist (b. 1892)
September 23: Kogo Noda, screenwriter (b. 1893)

See also
 1968 in Japanese television
 List of Japanese films of 1968

References

 
1960s in Japan
Japan
Years of the 20th century in Japan